Misso Parish was a rural municipality of Estonia, in Võru County. It had a population of 780 (as of 1 January 2009) and an area of 189.35 km2.

In 2017, it merged with Rõuge Parish, Haanja Parish, Mõniste Parish, and Varstu Parish to create a new entity. It retained the Rõuge Parish name.

Settlements
Small borough
Misso
Villages
Häärmäni - Hindsa - Hino - Horosuu - Hürsi - Käbli - Kärinä - Kaubi - Kimalasõ - Kivioru - Koorla - Korgõssaarõ - Kossa - Kriiva - Kundsa - Kurõ - Laisi - Leimani - Lütä - Määsi - Mauri - Missokülä - Mokra - Möldre - Muraski - Napi - Pältre - Parmu - Pedejä - Põnni - Põrstõ - Pruntova - Pulli - Pupli - Rammuka - Rebäse - Ritsiko - Saagri - Saagrimäe - Saika - Sakudi - Sandi - Sapi - Savimäe - Savioja - Siksälä - Suurõsuu - Tiastõ - Tiilige - Tika - Toodsi - Tserebi - Tsiistre - Väiko-Tiilige

References

External links
 
Ylenurme.weebly.com 

Former municipalities of Estonia